Once is a 2007 Irish 
romantic musical drama film written and directed by John Carney. The film stars Glen Hansard and Markéta Irglová as two struggling musicians in Dublin, Ireland. Hansard and Irglová had previously performed music as the Swell Season, and composed and performed the film's original songs.

Once spent years in development with the Irish Film Board and was made for a budget of €112,000. It was a commercial success, earning substantial per-screen box office averages in the United States, and received acclaim from critics. It received awards including the 2007 Independent Spirit Award for Best Foreign Film. Hansard and Irglová's song "Falling Slowly" won the 2008 Academy Award for Best Original Song, and the soundtrack received a Grammy Award nomination. The film has also been adapted into a successful stage musical.

Plot
A thirty-something busker (Guy) performs with his guitar on Grafton Street, Dublin only for his performance to be interrupted when he chases a man who steals his money. Lured by his music, a young Czech flower seller (Girl) talks to him about his songs. Delighted to learn that he repairs hoovers, Girl asks Guy to fix hers. The next day Girl returns with her broken vacuum and tells him she is also a musician.

At a music store where Girl usually plays piano, Guy teaches her one of his songs ("Falling Slowly"); they sing and play together. He invites her to his father's shop, and on the bus home musically answers Girl's question about what his songs are about: a long-time girlfriend who cheated on him, then left ("Broken Hearted Hoover Fixer Sucker Guy").

At the shop, Guy introduces Girl to his father and takes her to his room, but when he asks her to stay the night, she gets upset and leaves. The next day, they reconcile and spend the week writing, rehearsing and recording songs. Girl writes the lyrics for one of Guy's songs ("If You Want Me"), singing to herself while walking down the street; at a party, people perform impromptu (including "Gold").

Guy works on "Lies", a song about his ex-girlfriend, who moved to London. Girl encourages him to win her back. Invited to her home, he discovers she has a toddler and lives with her mother. Guy decides to move to London, but he wants to record a demo of his songs to take with him and asks Girl to record it with him. They secure a bank loan and reserve time at a recording studio.

Guy learns Girl has a husband in the Czech Republic. When he asks if she still loves her husband, Girl answers in Czech, "Miluji tebe" ("I love you"), but coyly declines to translate. After recruiting a band with other buskers, they go into the studio to record. They impress Eamon, the jaded studio engineer, with their first song ("When Your Mind's Made Up"). On a break in the early morning, Girl finds a piano in an empty studio and plays Guy one of her own compositions ("The Hill").

After the all-night session wraps up, they walk home. Before they part ways, Girl reveals that she spoke to her husband and he is coming to live with her in Dublin. Guy persuades her to spend his last night in Dublin with him, but she stands him up and he cannot find her to say goodbye before his flight. He plays the demo for his father, who gives him money to help him get settled in London. Before leaving for the airport, Guy buys Girl a piano and makes arrangements for its delivery, then calls his ex-girlfriend, who is happy about his imminent arrival. Girl reunites with her husband in Dublin and plays the piano in their home.

Cast

 Glen Hansard as Guy
 Markéta Irglová as Girl 
 Hugh Walsh as Timmy Drummer
 Gerard Hendrick as Lead Guitarist 
 Alaistair Foley as Bassist
 Geoff Minogue as Éamon
 Bill Hodnett as Guy's Dad
 Danuse Ktrestova as Girl's Mother
 Darren Healy as Heroin Addict
 Mal Whyte as Bill
 Marcella Plunkett as Ex-girlfriend
 Niall Cleary as Bob
 Wiltold Owski as Man watching TV
 Krzysztof Płotka as Man watching TV
 Tomek Głowacki Man watching TV
 Keith Byrne as Guy in Piano Shop

Production

The two leads, Hansard and Irglová, are professional musicians. Director Carney, former bassist for Hansard's band the Frames, had asked a long-time friend to share busker anecdotes and compose songs for the film, but originally intended the male lead to be played by actor Cillian Murphy, who was an almost-signed rock musician before turning to acting. Murphy was also going to be one of the film's producers, but reportedly did not like the prospect of acting opposite non-actor Irglová, who was then 17 years old. Murphy also believed he did not have the vocal capabilities to belt out Hansard's octave-leaping songs, so he pulled out, as did the film's other producers, also withdrawing their financial support. Carney then turned to songwriter Hansard, who had done only one acting job before, a supporting role as guitarist Outspan Foster in the 1991 ensemble film The Commitments, the story of a Dublin soul music cover band. Initially, Hansard was reluctant, fearing that he wouldn't be able to pull it off, but after stipulating that he had to be fully involved in the filmmaking process and that it be low-budget and intimate, he agreed.

Produced on a shoestring, about 75 percent of the budget was funded by Bord Scannán na hÉireann (The Irish Film Board), with Carney committing some of his own money. The director gave his salary to the two stars, and promised a share of the proceeds to everyone if the film was a success. Filmed with a skeleton crew on a 17-day shoot, the filmmakers saved money by using natural light and shooting at friends' houses. The musical party scene was filmed in Hansard's own flat, with his personal friends playing the partygoers/musicians. His mother, Catherine Hansard, is briefly featured singing solo. The Dublin street scenes were recorded without permits, and with a long lens so that many passersby didn't realize that a film was being made. The long lens also helped the non-professional actors relax and forget about the camera, and some of the dialogue was improvised.

The unrequited ending of the film was an element of the script that stayed consistent throughout production. Said Hansard, "A lot of films let themselves down really badly by wrapping everything up in the last five minutes and giving you a story that trails off lovely. And what happens with those films is that you enjoy them but you forget them, because the story didn’t rip you. But some films pull you in, and then they leave you on edge. They end, and you’re left thinking about it. And that’s really the power of cinema, the duty of cinema—to make you feel something." Hansard said ad-libbing produced the moment where Irglova's character tells the Guy in un-subtitled Czech, "No, I love you," but when it was shot, he didn't know what she'd said, just like his character.

During the shoot, Carney had predicted a romance between Hansard and Irglová, calling the two his "Bogart and Bacall." Hansard and Irglová did become a couple in real life, getting together while on a promotional tour across North America, and living together in Dublin, in Hansard's flat. Entertainment Weekly reported: 

In 2009, Hansard indicated they were no longer a romantic couple. He said, "Of course, we fell into each other's arms. It was a very necessary part of our friendship but I think we both concluded that that wasn't what we really wanted to do. So we're not together now. We are just really good friends."

As a result of the film, Hansard and Irglová released music and toured together as The Swell Season.

Glen Hansard and Markéta Irglová reprised their roles in The Simpsons episode "In the Name of the Grandfather."

Reception

Box office
A rough cut of the film was previewed on 15 July 2006 at the Galway Film Fleadh, but the film was subsequently turned down by several prestigious European film festivals. However, once finished, it secured spots at the 2007 Sundance Film Festival on 20 January 2007 and the Dublin Film Festival in February 2007, and received the audience awards at both events.

The film was first released on cinema in Ireland on 23 March 2007, followed by a limited release in the United States on 16 May 2007. After its second weekend in release in the United States and Canada, the film topped the 23 May 2007 indieWIRE box office chart with nearly $31,000 average per location. As of 28 March 2009, Once has grossed nearly $9.5 million in North America and over $20 million worldwide.

Accolades
After 2007's box office success and critical acclaim, the film won the Independent Spirit Award for Best Foreign Film. Steven Spielberg was quoted as saying, "a little movie called Once gave me enough inspiration to last the rest of the year." When informed of Spielberg's comments, director John Carney told Sky News, "in the end of the day, he's just a guy with a beard." At the time of that interview, Carney himself was also wearing a beard.

The song "Falling Slowly" won the 2007 Academy Award for Best Original Song. The nomination's eligibility for the Oscar was initially questioned, as versions of the song had been recorded on The Cost and The Swell Season albums and it was also included in the movie Beauty in Trouble (all released in 2006); those issues were resolved before the voting for the award took place. The AMPAS music committee members satisfied themselves that the song had indeed been written for the film and determined that, in the course of the film's protracted production, the composers had "played the song in some venues that were deemed inconsequential enough to not change the song’s eligibility."

Critical response
Once received widespread acclaim from critics. Upon its March 2007 release in Ireland, RTÉ's Caroline Hennessy gave the film 4 out of 5 stars and termed it "an unexpected treasure". About the acting, this Irish reviewer commented, "Once has wonderfully natural performances from the two leads. Although musicians first and actors second, they acquit themselves well in both areas. Irglová, a largely unknown quantity alongside the well-known and either loved or loathed Hansard, is luminous." Michael Dwyer of The Irish Times gave the film the same rating, calling it "irresistibly appealing" and noting that "Carney makes the point – without ever labouring it – that his protagonists are living in a changing city where the economic boom has passed them by. His keen eye for authentic locations is ... evident".

Once won very high marks from U.S. critics. On Rotten Tomatoes, it holds a 97% approval rating based on 159 reviews, with an average score of 8.30/10. The website's critical consensus states, "A charming, captivating tale of love and music, Once sets the standard for the modern musical. And with Dublin as its backdrop, Once is fun and fresh." On Metacritic, the film has a weighted average score of 88 out of 100 based on reviews from 33 critics, indicating "universal acclaim". In May, on Ebert & Roeper, both Richard Roeper and guest critic Michael Phillips of the Chicago Tribune gave enthusiastic reviews. Phillips called it, "the most charming thing I've seen all year", "the Brief Encounter for the 21st century", his favorite music film since 1984's Stop Making Sense and said, "It may well be the best music film of our generation". Roeper referred to the film's recording studio scene as "more inspirational and uplifting than almost any number of Dreamgirls or Chicago or any of those multi-zillion dollar musical showstopping films. In its own way, it will blow you away." Ebert gave the film four stars out of four, saying that he was "not at all surprised" that Philips had named it the best film of the year.

In late 2007, Amy Simmons of Time Out London wrote, "Carney’s highly charged, urban mise-en-scène with its blinking street lamps, vacant shops and dishevelled bed-sits provides ample poetic backdrop for the film’s lengthy tracking shots, epitomised in a sequence where the Girl walks to the corner shop in pyjamas and slippers while listening to one of the Guy’s songs on her personal stereo. With outstanding performances from Hansard and newcomer Irglová, Carney has created a sublime, visual album of unassuming and self-assured eloquence." The Telegraph'''s Sukhdev Sandhu said, "Not since Before Sunset has a romantic film managed to be as touching, funny or as hard to forget as Once. Like Before Sunset, it never outstays its welcome, climaxing on a note of rare charm and unexpectedness."

The film appeared on many North American critics' top ten lists of the best films of 2007:

 1st – Michael Phillips, The Chicago Tribune 1st – Nathan Rabin, The A.V. Club 2nd – David Germain, Associated Press
 2nd – Kevin Crust, Los Angeles Times 2nd – Kyle Smith, New York Post 2nd – Shawn Levy, The Oregonian 2nd – Roger Moore, The Orlando Sentinel 2nd – Robert Butler, Kansas City Star 2nd – Paste Magazine 3rd – Christy Lemire, Associated Press
 3rd – Tasha Robinson, The A.V. Club 3rd – Andrew Gray, Tribune Chronicle 3rd – Sean Means, Salt Lake Tribune 4th – Keith Phipps, The A.V. Club 4th – Christopher Kelly, Star Telegram 5th – Ann Hornaday, The Washington Post 5th – Desson Thomson, The Washington Post 5th – Noel Murray, The A.V. Club 6th – Ella Taylor, LA Weekly 7th – Claudia Puig, USA Today 7th – Dana Stevens, Slate 7th – Scott Tobias, The A.V. Club 7th – Scott Mantz, Access Hollywood 7th – Craig Outhier, Orange County Register 8th – Liam Lacey and Rick Groen, The Globe and Mail 8th – Owen Gleiberman, Entertainment Weekly 8th – Stephanie Zacharek, Salon 9th – Joe Morgenstern, The Wall Street Journal 9th – Michael Rechtshaffen, The Hollywood Reporter 9th – Richard Roeper, At the Movies with Ebert & Roeper 9th – Kenneth Turan, Los Angeles Times 9th – Carina Chocano, Los Angeles Times 9th – James Verniere, Boston Herald 10th – Bob Mondello, NPR
 10th – Peter Vonder Haar, Film ThreatIn 2008, the film placed third on Entertainment Weekly's "25 Best Romantic Movies of the Past 25 Years".

Home media Once was released on DVD in the US on 18 December 2007, and in the UK on 25 February 2008, followed by a British Blu-ray release on 16 February 2009. Once was released on Blu-ray in the US as an Amazon exclusive on 1 April 2014.

Soundtrack

The soundtrack album was released on 22 May 2007 in the United States and four days later in Ireland.

A collector's edition of the soundtrack was released on 4 December 2007 in the U.S. with additional songs and a bonus DVD featuring live performances and interviews about the film. The additional songs were two previously unreleased Van Morrison covers: Hansard's "And the Healing Has Begun," and Hansard and Irglová's "Into the Mystic."

Different versions of several of the soundtrack's songs previously were released on The Frames' album The Cost and on Hansard and Irglová's The Swell Season, both released in 2006. An early version of the final track, "Say It to Me Now," originally appeared on The Frames' 1995 album Fitzcarraldo. "All the Way Down" first appeared on the self-titled album from musician collective The Cake Sale, with Gemma Hayes providing vocals. The song "Gold" was written by Irish singer-songwriter Fergus O'Farrell and performed by Interference.

Track listing

Accolades
The soundtrack was nominated for two 2008 Grammy Awards, under Best Compilation Soundtrack Album for Motion Picture, Television or Other Visual Media and, for "Falling Slowly," Best Song Written for Motion Picture, Television or Other Visual Media. It won the Los Angeles Film Critics Association Award for Best Music, and it was ranked at number two on the Entertainment Weekly 25 New Classic Soundtrack Albums list (1983–2008).

 Charts success 
The soundtrack album reached #20 on the Irish Albums Chart in its first week, peaking at #15 a few weeks later. Following the Oscar win, the album reached the top of the chart, while "Falling Slowly" reached a new peak of #2.

As of 11 July 2007, the album had sold 54,753 copies in the United States. The album reached #27 on the Billboard 200 and also reached #2 on the Soundtracks Chart and #4 on the Independent Chart.

Certifications

Stage adaptation

The film has been adapted for the stage as the musical (Once). It first opened at the New York Theatre Workshop on 6 December 2011. The screenplay was adapted by Enda Walsh and the production directed by John Tiffany.

In February 2012, the musical transferred to Broadway's Bernard B. Jacobs Theatre. It began in previews on 28 February 2012 and opened on 18 March 2012. Directed by John Tiffany, the cast features Steve Kazee as Guy and Cristin Milioti as Girl with sets and costumes by Bob Crowley. The music is from the film with two additional songs, and the cast is also the orchestra. The musical opened up to generally positive reviews. Since its opening,  Once has been named Best Musical by The Outer Critics' Circle, Drama League, The New York Drama Critics' Circle, and the Tony Awards.

The Broadway production of Once was nominated for a total of 11 Tony Awards, including Best Musical, Best Actor in a Musical (Steve Kazee), Best Actress in a Musical (Cristin Milioti), Best Featured Actress in a Musical (Elizabeth A. Davis) and Best Direction of a Musical. On 10 June 2012, it won eight Tony Awards including Best Musical, Best Direction of a Musical, Best Book of a Musical and Best Actor in a Musical.

See also
 Busking
 Once (musical)
 Cinema of Ireland
 Musical films

References

External links
 Icon Movies' Official U.K. Once Website
 Fox Searchlight's Official U.S. Once Website 
 
 
 
 
 
 Once and Other Irish Films
 "Lies" from Once named Best New Film Song

Interviews
 
 Interview with Hansard and Irglová at Janaki's Musings
 Interview with John Carney at Janaki's Musings

Reviews
 "Movie Review: Once", Entertainment Weekly review by Owen Gleiberman (15 May 2007)
 "Once: 3.5 out of 4 stars", Rolling Stone'' review by Peter Travers (17 May 2007)
 "Movie Review: Once", stv.tv

2007 films
2007 romantic drama films
2000s English-language films
2000s musical drama films
2000s romantic musical films
Czech-language films
Films about guitars and guitarists
Films about music and musicians
Films directed by John Carney
Films set in Dublin (city)
Films shot in Dublin (city)
Films that won the Best Original Song Academy Award
Independent Spirit Award for Best Foreign Film winners
Sundance Film Festival award winners
2007 independent films
English-language Irish films
Irish musical drama films
Irish romantic drama films
Irish Film Board films
The Swell Season albums